Euskal Ezkerra (EuE) (in English: Basque Left) was a political party in Euskadi, Spain. EuE was formed as break-away from Euskadiko Ezkerra in 1993 when EuE merged with Spanish Socialist Workers' Party.

History
Soon after themselves merged with Eusko Alkartasuna, a social-democratic Basque nationalist party, but because of the bad results in the 1993 Spanish general election they broke the coalition and soon afterwards Euskal Ezkerra was dissolved and some of their members continued taking part in other parties.

References

1993 establishments in Spain
Basque nationalism
Defunct political parties in the Basque Country (autonomous community)
Defunct social democratic parties in Spain
Political parties established in 1993
Political parties with year of disestablishment missing
Spanish Socialist Workers' Party